The 2005-06 Houston Rockets season was the team's 39th in the NBA. They began the season hoping to improve upon their 51–31 output from the previous season. However, they came up seventeen games shy of tying it, finishing 34–48, and failing to qualify for the playoffs for the first time in three seasons.  Tracy McGrady played in only 47 games after complaining about back spasms while Yao Ming missed time due to foot injuries. Despite their injuries, they were still voted to play in the 2006 NBA All-Star Game held in Houston.

Roster

Roster Notes
 Small forward Tracy McGrady played 47 games (his last game being on March 8, 2006) but missed the rest of the season due to severe back spasms.
 Point guard Bob Sura missed the entire season after undergoing surgery to repair a ruptured disc in his back.

Regular season

Record vs. opponents

Awards
Yao Ming, All-NBA Third Team
Luther Head, NBA All-Rookie Team 2nd Team

References

Houston Rockets seasons